Sir John Arundell (circa 1366 – 11 January 1435), called The Magnificent, of Lanherne in the parish of St Mawgan in Pydar in  Cornwall, was an English knight who inherited large estates in the County of Cornwall. He was Sheriff of Cornwall and was one of Henry IV of England’s  Kings Knights. In his will dated 1433, he bequeathed money for the preservation of the head of St Piran in the chapel at Perranzabuloe.

Career
John Arundell was knighted in 1399 at the coronation of Henry IV of England. In February 1405, as ‘King’s knight’, Arundell was appointed as Captain of Marck, one of the Calais outposts, this included the castle and town with all lands, fisheries, franchises and perquisites outside the liberty of Calais were granted to him for life. 
He served in the navy 1418–19; married Annora Lambourn of Perranzabuloe, which brought to the Arundells several more Cornish manors. He was Sheriff of Cornwall four times and a member for the Cornwall 1422–23.

Marriage and issue
John Arundell married Annorah Lambourne, daughter of Sir William Lambourne.
 John Arundell (1392–1423) who married Margaret Burghersh in 1420 in Hertfordshire, the daughter of Sir John Burghersh and Ismarria Hanning (or Hanham)
 Sir Thomas Arundell ( – 1443) who married 1. Elizabeth Powlet 2. Margery L'Arcedekne ( – 1420)
 Renfrew Arundell ( – 1442) who married Joan Colshull (1407–1497) dau of Sir John Colshull and Anne Challons
 Joan Arundell - became Abbess at Canonsleigh in Devon

Death
Arundell made financial arrangements in his will that would maintain a chantry of five chaplains and a clerk at St Columb Major. The condition of this arrangement was that they would continue to pray for the souls of Arundell, and his kindred. He also left money to build a chapel in the parish church of St Columb Major to house his own tomb. He died on 11 January 1435 and his will was proved on 7 June.

See also

 Arundell family

References

1360s births
1435 deaths
People from St Mawgan
Burials in Cornwall
Members of the Parliament of England (pre-1707) for Cornwall
English knights
English MPs January 1397
English MPs September 1397
English MPs January 1404
English MPs October 1404
English MPs 1406
English MPs 1411
English MPs April 1414
English MPs March 1416
English MPs 1417
English MPs May 1421
English MPs 1422
English MPs 1423
High Sheriffs of Cornwall
High Sheriffs of Devon
John (1366)
15th-century English landowners
14th-century English landowners

Year of birth uncertain